Sebastian Suarez (born March 1, 1991), is a Chilean professional basketball player. He currently plays for CD Valdivia of the Liga Nacional de Básquetbol de Chile.

In the 2016-17 season, he played for the Penarol Mar del Plata club of the Argentinean Liga Nacional de Básquet.

He represented Chile's national basketball team at the 2016 South American Basketball Championship, where he recorded most minutes and steals for his team.

Sebastian is the son of legendary Chilean national basketball team player Luis "Caco" Suarez.

References

External links
 Portland State profile
 Latinbasket.com Profile
 PointAfter profile

1991 births
Living people
Chilean expatriate basketball people in Argentina
Chilean expatriate basketball people in the United States
Chilean expatriate basketball people in Venezuela
Chilean men's basketball players
Panteras de Miranda players
Peñarol de Mar del Plata basketball players
People from Ancud
Point guards
Portland State Vikings men's basketball players
Shooting guards
Chile men's national basketball team players